Christopher Deon "Chris" Brown (born 15 October 1978), also known as "Fireman", is a Bahamian track and field athlete from the Bahamian island of Eleuthera, who mainly competes in the 400 m. In addition to winning medals in individual contests, he has also won four World Championships medals in the relay. He also won a gold medal in the relay at the 2012 London Olympic Games. He is an alumnus of
Norfolk State University.

In 2005 he finished fourth in the 400 m final at the World Championships. Also took a silver medal in the 4 × 400 m relay a few days later.

In 2007, his most successful year, Brown won gold medals in both the individual 400 m and the 4 × 400 m relay at the 2007 Pan American Games. In the 2007 World Championships in Osaka, Brown tied the Bahamian national record, when finishing fourth in the 400 m final. Brown (together with Avard Moncur, Andrae Williams and Michael Mathieu) also won silver in the 4 × 400 m relay at the 2007 World Championships.

In 2008 at the Beijing Olympics he placed fourth in the 400 m final when he was initially in 3rd place, American runner David Neville dived across the line just ahead of him. He lost the bronze by 0.04 seconds. A few days later he picked up a silver medal in the 4 × 400 m relay along with Andretti Bain, Michael Mathieu and Andrae Williams.

In 2012, Brown finished third in the 400 m finals at the World Indoor Championships behind countryman Demetrius Pinder. He once again finished fourth in the Olympic 400 m final. He won his first Olympic gold medal four days later in the 4 × 400 m relay with Demetrius Pinder, Michael Mathieu and Ramon Miller, They beat the defending champions the United States, marking the first Olympic men's gold medal in any athletics event for the Bahamas and the first American loss in that race at the Olympics since 1972.  

At both the 2014 and 2015 IAAF World Relays held in his home country of The Bahamas he was part of the silver medal-winning 4x400 men's relay team.

On 22 August 2012 the Bahamian government named a street in his honor in his hometown of Wemyss Bight, Eleuthera.

References

External links

1978 births
Living people
Bahamian male sprinters
Olympic athletes of the Bahamas
Olympic gold medalists for the Bahamas
Olympic silver medalists for the Bahamas
Olympic bronze medalists for the Bahamas
Athletes (track and field) at the 2000 Summer Olympics
Athletes (track and field) at the 2004 Summer Olympics
Athletes (track and field) at the 2008 Summer Olympics
Athletes (track and field) at the 2012 Summer Olympics
Athletes (track and field) at the 2016 Summer Olympics
Athletes (track and field) at the 1998 Commonwealth Games
Athletes (track and field) at the 2002 Commonwealth Games
Athletes (track and field) at the 2006 Commonwealth Games
Athletes (track and field) at the 1999 Pan American Games
Athletes (track and field) at the 2007 Pan American Games
Athletes (track and field) at the 2011 Pan American Games
Commonwealth Games medallists in athletics
Pan American Games gold medalists for the Bahamas
World Athletics Championships medalists
Medalists at the 2012 Summer Olympics
Medalists at the 2008 Summer Olympics
Athletes (track and field) at the 2014 Commonwealth Games
World Athletics Championships athletes for the Bahamas
People from Eleuthera
Medalists at the 2000 Summer Olympics
Olympic gold medalists in athletics (track and field)
Olympic silver medalists in athletics (track and field)
Olympic bronze medalists in athletics (track and field)
Medalists at the 2016 Summer Olympics
Commonwealth Games silver medallists for the Bahamas
Commonwealth Games bronze medallists for the Bahamas
Pan American Games medalists in athletics (track and field)
World Athletics Indoor Championships winners
World Athletics Indoor Championships medalists
World Athletics Championships winners
Medalists at the 2007 Pan American Games
Central American and Caribbean Games medalists in athletics
Central American and Caribbean Games bronze medalists for the Bahamas
Competitors at the 1998 Central American and Caribbean Games
Medallists at the 2002 Commonwealth Games
Medallists at the 2014 Commonwealth Games